Iron Angel of the Apocalypse: The Return is a video game developed and published by Japanese studio Synergy, Inc. for the 3DO in 1995 and Windows in 1996. It is the sequel to Iron Angel of the Apocalypse.

Gameplay 

Iron Angel of the Apocalypse: The Return is a first-person shooter. It is set in a sci-fi futuristic and shooter themes.

Synopsis 

The story picks up shortly after the events of the previous game. After his showdown with the Scientist and the Android, Tetsujin finds himself disembodied. A mysterious corporation known as SCR gives Tetsujin a new body, but their plans for Tetsujin are mysterious.

Development and release

Reception 

Next Generation reviewed the 3DO version of the game, rating it two stars out of five, and stated that "Having sacrificed a lot of the more bizarre elements that made the original worth playing, the sequel simply doesn't offer enough improvements to make up for the loss."

Reviews
3DO Magazine

Notes

References

External links
 Iron Angel of the Apocalypse: The Return at GameFAQs
 Iron Angel of the Apocalypse: The Return at Giant Bomb
 Iron Angel of the Apocalypse: The Return at MobyGames

1995 video games
3DO Interactive Multiplayer games
3DO Interactive Multiplayer-only games
First-person shooters
Sprite-based first-person shooters
Video games about mecha
Video games developed in Japan
Video games with 2.5D graphics